Sambeek is a village in the southern Netherlands. It is located in the  former municipality of Boxmeer, North Brabant. Since 2022 it has been part of the new municipality of Land van Cuijk.

History 
Sambeek is a linear settlement which developed on the river bank of the Maas in the Early Middle Ages.

The tower of Sambeek is, with its height of 50 meters, the centre of the village. The oldest part of the tower dates from 1486. This tower was a part of the local Roman Catholic church, which was blown up by the Germans in the Second World War. Their plan to blow up the tower failed, it was only slightly damaged. The St John the Baptish church was built as the replacement of the destroyed church in 1952, but is detached from the tower.

The thickest lime tree in the Netherlands stands in the southern part of Sambeek. Its age is estimated at 500 to 1000 years.

The former Redemptorist monastery was founded in 1874. In 1882, a wing with chapel was added in Renaissance Revival style.

Sambeek was home to 703 people in 1840. It was an independent municipality until 1942, when the municipality was divided between Oploo, Sint Anthonis en Ledeacker and Vierlingsbeek. The village was severely damaged in 1944 during World War II. Sambeek became part of the municipality of Land van Cuijk in 2022.

Gallery

References

Populated places in North Brabant
Former municipalities of North Brabant
Geography of Land van Cuijk